Pipe Creek is a stream in the U.S. state of Indiana. It is a tributary of the Wabash River.

Pipe Creek is the English translation of the native Miami-Illinois language name.

See also
List of rivers of Indiana

References

Rivers of Cass County, Indiana
Rivers of Grant County, Indiana
Rivers of Howard County, Indiana
Rivers of Miami County, Indiana
Rivers of Indiana